Bagra Tawa is a village in Narmadapuram district of Madhya Pradesh State of India.

The Bagra Tawa railway station of the village lies on the Jabalpur - Itarsi railway line of Western Central Railway Zone of Indian Railway.

References

Villages in Narmadapuram district